Jorge Romero Romero (10 November 1964 – 16 July 2021) was a Mexican politician affiliated with the Institutional Revolutionary Party. As of 2014 he served as Deputy of the LIX and LXI Legislatures of the Mexican Congress representing Hidalgo.

References

1964 births
2021 deaths
Politicians from Pachuca, Hidalgo
Institutional Revolutionary Party politicians
21st-century Mexican politicians
Deputies of the LXI Legislature of Mexico
Members of the Chamber of Deputies (Mexico) for Hidalgo (state)